The women's triathlon was part of the Triathlon at the 2010 Asian Games program, was held in Guangzhou Triathlon Venue on November 13, 2010.

The race was held over the "international distance" and consisted of  swimming,  road bicycle racing, and  road running.

Schedule
All times are China Standard Time (UTC+08:00)

Results

References 

Results

Triathlon at the 2010 Asian Games